A process of cabinet formation took place following the 2021 Dutch general election, leading to the formation of the Fourth Rutte cabinet in 2022. The coalition consists of People's Party for Freedom and Democracy (VVD), Democrats 66 (D66), Christian Democratic Appeal (CDA) and Christian Union (CU), the same parties that formed the preceding Third Rutte cabinet. At 299 days, it was the longest formation in Dutch history.

* Jorritsma & Ollongren (Scouts)  ** Van Ark & Koolmees (Scouts)

Background 
The third Rutte cabinet resigned in January 2021 because of a report on the Dutch childcare benefits scandal. As the election of March 2021 took place during the COVID-19 pandemic, parties wanted a short cabinet formation. Leader of the People's Party for Freedom and Democracy (VVD) Mark Rutte even suggested dividing the formation into two parts, with parties first collectively working on a recovery plan for the Covid crisis.

During the campaign, some parties already expressed preferences for coalition partners. Christian Democratic Appeal (CDA) and VVD ruled out cooperation with the radical-right parties Party for Freedom (PVV) and Forum for Democracy (FvD). VVD explicitly indicated that it wanted to govern with CDA. GroenLinks proposed that the progressive parties D66 and PvdA should join a coalition together, but both parties rejected this. GroenLinks and PvdA indicated that they only wanted to join cabinet if the other party or the Socialist Party (SP) also joined. Contrary to previous elections, SP no longer ruled out cooperation with the VVD and did not impose another left-wing party in the cabinet as a condition. After the appointment of party leader Esther Ouwehand, Party for the Animals (PvdD) was also open to joining a cabinet. During the campaign, coalition partners D66 and Christian Union (CU) emphasized their differences regarding medical-ethical questions, making cooperation between those parties unlikely.

Election results and possible coalitions

After the elections the liberal parties VVD and D66 both gained seats, with D66 becoming the second largest party and VVD maintaining its position as largest party. FvD gained the most seats, growing from two to eight seats. PvdD was the only other sitting party that managed to grow, with one seat. Four parties (Volt, JA21, BIJ1 and Farmer–Citizen Movement (BBB)) managed to join parliament for the first time. All other parties lost or kept their seats. With 17 parties, this was the highest number of elected groups since the 1918 Dutch general election. Because of this fragmentation, a majority cabinet had to consist of at least four parties. For the first time since the 1998 Dutch general election a sitting cabinet won seats in the general election. With 28 seats, the radical-right (JA21, PVV and FVD) achieved the best result ever. The traditional left parties (GroenLinks, PvdA, and SP) were smaller than ever with a combined 26 seats.

Coalition preferences among voters 
Although voters in the Netherlands have no formal influence on the cabinet formation, several polls were published on voters' coalition preferences. A poll by EenVandaag showed continuation of Third Rutte cabinet with VVD-D66-CDA-CU as most popular among all voters, but quite low among D66 voters. Subsequent most popular combinations were VVD-D66-CDA-Volt, VVD-D66-CDA-PvdA, and VVD-PVV-CDA-FVD-JA21. A poll by Peil.nl published on 28 March showed that out of ten combinations VVD-D66-CDA-JA21 was the most popular among voters, but placed sixth among D66 voters. The combination VVD-D66-PvdA-SP-GroenLinks ranked second, but in last place among VVD voters.

Scouts Jorritsma and Ollongren 

On 18 March, the expected seventeen parliamentary leaders met to discuss the formation, and to select a scout to investigate which coalitions would be possible. Against custom, D66 insisted on a second scout from their party. Subsequently, VVD Senate leader Annemarie Jorritsma and Ministry of the Interior and Kingdom Relations Kajsa Ollongren (D66) were appointed as scouts. In order of the expected size, the expected parliamentary leaders were invited for individual meetings on 22 and 23 March.

VVD and D66 had different coalition preferences. VVD leader Mark Rutte first wanted to "look seriously" at a center-right coalition with D66, CDA and JA21. However, D66-leader Kaag found collaboration with JA21 "difficult to imagine" and preferred a progressive coalition, without naming parties. Collaboration with one of the left-wing progressive parties, on the other hand, was only an option for Rutte after considering CU.

A number of parties were open to cabinet participation. PVV leader Geert Wilders said that a right-wing coalition of VVD, CDA, PVV, FVD and JA21 should be investigated, but this was ruled out by VVD. Lilianne Ploumen said PvdA was open to cabinet participation, provided that SP or GroenLinks also joined. GroenLinks-leader Klaver was also open to government participation in an "as progressive as possible cabinet". PvdD leader Esther Ouwehand also argued for a cabinet that was as green and progressive as possible. JA21-leader Joost Eerdmans supported Rutte's wish to form a right-wing cabinet of VVD, D66, CDA and JA21.

Most other parties were hesitant about joining a cabinet at this stage for various reasons. CDA-leader Wopke Hoekstra said he had no desire to join a "liberal block". SP-leader Lilian Marijnissen thought that coalition participation was not obvious given the electoral defeat. Although FVD leader Thierry Baudet indicated on election evening that cabinet participation was possible, he no longer expected this after talking to the scouts. As the tenth political group in terms of seats, CU-leader Gert-Jan Segers considered it strange if parties started the negotiations with them. Although there was speculation about cabinet participation by newcomer Volt, party leader Laurens Dassen was cautious about this. The other groups, with three or fewer seats, all indicated that cabinet participation was not an option for them.

Leaking of formation notes 

On 25 March, Rutte and Kaag were due to hold a second meeting with the scouts separately. However, after arriving at Binnenhof, where the meetings were taking place, Ollongren learned that she had tested positive for COVID-19 and had to go into quarantine. On the way to her car, Ollongren's notes about the formation were photographed by an ANP photographer. Among other things, it read: "position Omtzigt, function elsewhere". Omtzigt referring to member of parliament Pieter Omtzigt (CDA), whose efforts in the Dutch childcare benefits scandal contributed to the resignation of the previous cabinet. An hour and a half after the notes were leaked, Jorritsma and Ollongren resigned as scouts.

Several party leaders insisted on a debate about the leaked notes. Also on behalf of Kaag, Rutte indicated that same day that neither of them had said anything about Omtzigt in their conversations. In the same interview, Rutte indicated that the scouts could not be summoned for debate, because they had already left. Speaker of the House of Representatives Khadija Arib therefore asked Jorritsma and Ollongren as private persons to explain the notes, to which both agreed.

Just before the debate on the 1 April, it appeared from the published interview reports that Rutte had spoken about Omtzigt, specifically about a possible ministerial position. Rutte indicated that he had no memory of this. During this debate it also emerged that Rutte had heard "via-via" as early as 7.30 in the morning, a few hours before the other parliamentary leaders, that the notes probably stated that he had spoken about Omtzigt. During the debate, Rutte refused to reveal who had notified him. A motion of no confidence against Rutte as prime minister was rejected along the lines of the demissionary cabinet (77 against, 72 in favour). A motion of censure against Rutte as parliamentary leader, on the other hand, was supported by all parties except the VVD.

After the debate and the vote, SP and CU ruled out cooperation with VVD as long as Rutte was in charge. The youth parties of D66, CDA, PvdA, PvdD, GL and DENK encouraged their parent parties to do the same. Polls immediately after the debate also showed that 60% of voters did not want their party to enter into a coalition with VVD led by Rutte.

Scouts Van Ark and Koolmees

After Ollongren and Jorritsma resigned, the ministers Tamara van Ark (VVD) and Wouter Koolmees (D66) were appointed as scouts on 25 March. At the request of parliament, they delayed meetings until after the debate with the scouts who had resigned. During this debate, however, the House of Representatives passed a motion to request a new independent scouts. A day later on 2 April, Koolmees and Van Ark officially resigned.

Informateur Tjeenk Willink 

Herman Tjeenk Willink was appointed informateur for three weeks on 6 April, a role he had fulfilled five times before. In the first week he held talks with the parliamentary leaders, this time the smaller parties first. As a period of rest, he did not invite parliamentary leaders in the second week, but among others Nationale Ombudsman  and chair of the Social and Economic Council Mariëtte Hamer. In the weekend, Segers retracted his exclusion of cooperation with Rutte, but nevertheless preferred opposition. In the invitation to parliamentary leaders for meetings in the third week, Tjeenk Willink indicated that more time had to be taken for the formation, but that a recovery plan for the corona crisis had to be worked out quickly. Farid Azarkan (DENK), Wilders and Eerdmans were critical of this approach, which no longer was about the (lack of) trust in Rutte.

Mutual trust was again under pressure after, according to RTL Nieuws, a Council of Ministers decided at the end of 2019 to deliberately provide the House of Representatives with incomplete information about the Dutch childcare benefits scandal. Parliamentary leaders Rutte, Kaag and Hoekstra had attended the Council of Ministers as ministers. Rutte indicated that "nothing inappropriate" had happened and the Council of Ministers decided to release the minutes. During the debate on 29 April, the demissionary cabinet survived a motion of no confidence.

Tjeenk Willink had decided to wait until after this debate to present his final report, which he handed over on 30 April. In his report he indicated that the substantive formation could start. According to Tjeenk Willink, only BIJ1, PVV and SP explicitly ruled out governing with Rutte. Polls published around the time of the debate with Tjeenk Willink on 12 May also showed that fewer voters ruled out a coalition with Rutte.

Informateur Hamer

Scouting 
After the debate with Tjeenk Willink on 12 May, SER-chairman Mariëtte Hamer was nominated as informateur by Kaag and Rutte, which was approved by the House of Representatives. Her task was to first work towards recovery and transition policy after the corona crisis. Only after that, according to the motion, did she have to look for a coalition to form a government.

Like her predecessors, she invited the - after a split 18 - parliamentary leaders for a meeting on 17 and 18 May. Although the discussions were largely substantive, they were also asked about coalition preferences. Kaag expressed for the first time a preference for a specific coalition, consisting of VVD, CDA, D66, PvdA and GL.

Between the discussions with the group leaders, Hamer had discussions with a total of 28 representatives on specific topics. These included youth organisations, representatives of the cultural sector and  mayors.

In the last week of her assignment, Hamer focused on the search for a coalition. That week, Hamer received the parliamentary leaders of VVD, D66, CDA, PvdA, GL and CU in varying combinations. Hoekstra reacted reluctantly to Kaag's coalition preference for VVD, D66 and CDA, supplemented by two left-wing parties PvdA and GL. Voters of VVD and CDA also reacted negatively to this coalition in opinion polls. Ploumen and Klaver, however, repeated that they would only join a cabinet together. The other option discussed, continuation of the sitting coalition, was held off by Segers. At the end of the week, Hamer indicated that she needed more time than the original 6 June deadline. She said there were not many substantive differences, but the parties nevertheless did not want to work together in a cabinet.

The following week, Hamer brought the conflicting parties together again, but again this did not lead to a possible coalition. On 10 June, an internal document was leaked in which Omtzigt criticized his party, saying he felt unsafe. As a result of the leak, Omtzigt indicated two days later that he would leave the CDA and continue as an independent MP. The coalitions of VVD, D66 and CDA, supplemented by JA21 or Volt, previously mentioned by Hoekstra, would therefore no longer have a majority. At the end of that week, Hamer concluded that the formation was at an impasse. During a joint conversation with VVD, D66, CDA, PvdA, GL and CU, she urged the parties to come to a breakthrough during the weekend.

When the impasse was not broken after this weekend, Hamer suggested that Kaag and Rutte write the basis of a coalition agreement together, which other parties could then join at a later stage. On 22 June she presented her final report with that recommendation.

Start of coalition agreement between VVD and D66 
During the debate on Hamer's report on 23 June, the House agreed to her proposal. In the following weeks, representatives of VVD and D66, led by Hamer, negotiated in silence. VVD MPs Sophie Hermans and Mark Harbers negotiated with their D66 colleagues Rob Jetten and Steven van Weyenberg.

On 17 August, the document was shared with CDA, PvdA, GL and CU. A day before the document was shared, Kaag indicated in the Algemeen Dagblad that he was still against coalition with CU. On 20 August, Ploumen and Klaver announced that they wanted to join as one delegation during the cabinet negotiations. At party meetings a week later, members supported this approach and governing with VVD was not ruled out either. However, VVD and CDA indicated that this cooperation was insufficient reason to negotiate with the two parties.

On 2 September, Hamer presented her final report. In the report she recommended that a new informateur investigates a minority coalition, for which she made several proposals. The House debated the report on 7 September.

Informateur Remkes 

During the last debate with Hamer, a VVD motion was passed to appoint Johan Remkes as informateur.

On 15 September, the House of Representatives held a debate on the evacuation from Afghanistan. During the debate, motions of censure were tabled against the Minister of Foreign Affairs Sigrid Kaag and the Minister of Defense Ank Bijleveld (CDA). These were supported by the entire opposition and eventually also by CU. Kaag concluded that she therefore had to resign but remained on as party leader and negotiator for the formation. After initially staying on, Bijleveld also resigned the next day under political pressure. From 18 to 19 September, the negotiators from VVD, D66 and CDA met at the De Zwaluwenberg estate in Hilversum to talk with Remkes about the formation. However, this did not lead to a breakthrough, partly because of the events the week before.

The formation was officially halted from 20–26 September due to Prinsjesdag. During this period, the VVD and CDA jointly wrote a draft coalition agreement, dated 26 September. The goal of this draft was to convince D66 to form a minority government with them. According to the two parties, this was at the initiative of Remkes, while Remkes said it was on their own initiative. The existence and content of this document only became known after Segers left it on a train and it ended up at de Volkskrant in November. However, on September 26, Kaag said she was willing to "lift our political blockade", referring to the ChristianUnion. A day later, the negotiators from VVD, CDA and D66 met with Remkes for more than ten hours. Remkes concluded from this that there was no possibility for a minority cabinet, and therefore decided to investigate the possibilities for an extraparliamentary cabinet. On 29 September, discussions were held with VVD, D66, CDA, PvdA, GroenLinks, ChristianUnion, SGP, Volt and Liane den Haan about an extra-parliamentary cabinet. When this option did not receive sufficient support, D66 decided to lift the blockade against the coalition with ChristianUnion in order to prevent new elections. Remkes therefore presented his report the following day, in which he advised starting negotiations between VVD, D66, CDA and ChristianUnion.

Informateurs Remkes and Koolmees 
On 5 October, the House of Representatives held a debate on Remkes' report. During the debate, a motion was passed to appoint Johan Remkes and Wouter Koolmees as informateurs. For the duration of the formation, Koolmees relinquished his duties as Minister of Social Affairs and Employment, but did not resign. The substantive negotiations between the parties mainly took place between Sophie Hermans (VVD), Rob Jetten (D66), Pieter Heerma (CDA) and Carola Schouten (CU).

On 13 December, the spokesman for the cabinet formation announced that they had reached a negotiator's agreement. That document was then sent to the four parliamentary groups. After their approval, the agreement was presented on 15 December.

Formateur Rutte 

After the debate about the coalition agreement and the report of informateurs Koolmees and Remkes, a motion was passed to appoint Rutte as formateur. The Fourth Rutte cabinet was inaugurated on 10 January 2022.

References 

2021 in the Netherlands
Political scandals in the Netherlands
Dutch cabinet formation, 2021